Montgremay (940 m) is a mountain of the Jura, located south Cornol in the canton of Jura. It is one of the highest summits of the region of Ajoie.

References

External links
Montgremay on Hikr

Mountains of the Jura
Mountains of the canton of Jura
Mountains of Switzerland
Mountains of Switzerland under 1000 metres